Yanko Petrov Sandanski (born 23 November 1988) is a Bulgarian professional footballer who plays as a midfielder.

Career
He is defensive midfielder. Yanko was raised in CSKA Sofia's youth teams. He is a grandson of Yane Sandanski.

In January 2017, Sandanski joined Septemvri Sofia.  He left the club at the end of the 2017–18 season when his contract expired.

Honours
 Bulgarian Supercup: 2008 (with CSKA Sofia)

References

External links

1988 births
Living people
People from Kresna
Bulgarian footballers
Bulgaria under-21 international footballers
First Professional Football League (Bulgaria) players
Second Professional Football League (Bulgaria) players
PFC CSKA Sofia players
PFC Beroe Stara Zagora players
PFC Marek Dupnitsa players
PFC Pirin Blagoevgrad players
FC Montana players
PFC Slavia Sofia players
PFC Lokomotiv Plovdiv players
OFC Pirin Blagoevgrad players
FC Septemvri Sofia players
FC CSKA 1948 Sofia players
FC Vitosha Bistritsa players
PFC Minyor Pernik players
Association football midfielders
Macedonian Bulgarians
Sportspeople from Blagoevgrad Province